Trojany  is a village in the administrative district of Gmina Dąbrówka, within Wołomin County, Masovian Voivodeship, in east-central Poland.

The village has a population of 490.

References

Trojany